Igor Valentinovich Grokhovskiy (born 30 June 1973; died February 2005) was a Kazakhstani football player.

References

1973 births
2005 deaths
Soviet footballers
Kazakhstani footballers
FC Dynamo Moscow reserves players
Kazakhstani expatriate footballers
Expatriate footballers in Russia
FC Lokomotiv Nizhny Novgorod players
Russian Premier League players
Kazakhstan Premier League players
FC Arsenal Tula players
Association football forwards